Laton Donn Frederick Smith (born September 3, 1949) is a retired Canadian football player who played for the Ottawa Rough Riders. He played college football at Purdue University. Though drafted in 1973 by the Kansas City Chiefs, he returned to his hometown for his professional career.

References

1949 births
Living people
American players of Canadian football
Canadian football offensive linemen
Ottawa Rough Riders players
Purdue Boilermakers football players
Sportspeople from Rochester, Minnesota
Players of American football from Minnesota